The 17e régiment d'infanterie (English:17th Infantry Regiment) was a unit of the French army and among its oldest.

The French Revolutionary Wars
 1791: during the French Revolution, all regiments take on a number according to the age of their formation. The régiment d’Auvergne becomes the 17e régiment d’infanterie
 1793: at the beginning of the French Revolution, the regiment becomes 17e demi-brigade de bataille, which were composed of the following units:
 1st battalion of the 9e régiment d'infanterie de ligne ;
 2nd battalion of volunteers of the department of India ;
 3rd battalion of volunteers of Seine-Inférieure ;
 1796: during the second merger, the unit becomes the 17e demi-brigade d’infanterie de ligne, made of the following units:
 33e régiment d'infanterie, 1er bataillon du 17e régiment d’infanterie, 5e bataillon de volontaires de la Sarthe and 1er bataillon de volontaires colonial of Port-au-Prince) ;
 178e demi-brigade de bataille (2e bataillon du 99e régiment d'infanterie, 6e bataillon de volontaires de Nord and de volontaires de la Seine-Inférieure) ;
 demi-brigade d'Eure and Landes (3e bataillon de volontaires de la Eure, 5e bataillon de volontaires de la Landes and 6e bataillon de volontaires de la Haute-Garonne) ;

La Grande Armée
In 1803 becomes the 17e régiment d’infanterie de ligne. In 1806, the regiment took part in the battle of Jena-Auerstädt.

19th century

 1816: at the Bourbon Restoration, the regiment is renamed
 1854: renamed 17e régiment d’infanterie

20th century

 1907: during the revolt of the Languedoc winegrowers 500 members of the regiment mutinied and joined the demonstrators.
 1914: during the mobilisation, this unit gave birth to the 217e régiment d'infanterie
 1921: the 17th regiment is abolished

References

Sources

External links
 17e Regiment d'Infanterie history during Napoleonic War

Infantry regiments of France
Military units and formations established in 1791
Military units and formations disestablished in 1921